Hodgdon is a surname. Notable people with the surname include:

Albion Reed Hodgdon (1909–1976), American botanist
Bruce Hodgdon, American politician
Charles Hodgdon (1861–1948), American politician
Daniel Hodgdon, American academic administrator
Drew Hodgdon (born 1981), American football player
John Hodgdon (1800-?), American politician
Sylvester Phelps Hodgdon (1830–1906), American painter
Ted Hodgdon (1902-1984), American motorcycle journalist, corporate publicist, motorcycle distribution executive, and antique motorcycle enthusiast